

Players

Squad

Statistics

Top scorers

Captains

Results and fixtures

Scottish Premier League

Final standings

Scottish League Cup

Scottish Cup

Notes and references

 
 
 AFC Heritage Trust

Aberdeen F.C. seasons
Aberdeen